Stewart Smith may refer to:

Stewart Smith (politician) (1907–1993), leading member of the Communist Party of Canada
Stewart Henry Smith (1855–1896), Scottish rugby union player
J. Stewart Smith (1913–2008), New Zealand man who introduced invasive fish into the country's freshwater ecosystems
Stewart Smith, former member of the band Delirious?

See also
Steuart Smith (born 1952), musician
Stuart Smith (disambiguation)